Azekel Adesuyi, who uses the mononymous stage name Azekel, is a Nigerian born singer, songwriter, and record producer, from London. Azekel has released 3 solo EPs: Circa, Raw, Vol. 1, (2015)  and Raw, Vol. 2, (2016).

Career

2015: Raw, Vol. 1
Raw, Vol. 1 was released digitally on iTunes via Thunderlightning Recordings on 21 June 2015. It includes the lead singles "New Romance", "Mad About The Boy", and "Chronophobia". "New Romance" gained national wide radio play, and has been supported by a variety of blogs and artists, most notably Prince.

2016: Collaboration with Massive Attack
Azekel collaborated with the Bristol trip hop group Massive Attack, as he is featured on the title track of their EP, Ritual Spirit released on 28 January 2016.

2017: Collaboration with Gorillaz
Azekel collaborated with the British virtual band Gorillaz, as he is contributed on their fifth studio album Humanz on the track "Momentz" featuring De La Soul, and appeared on the super deluxe version of the album on the track "Midnite Float". The album was released on 28 April 2017 via Parlophone and Warner Bros. Records.

Discography

EPs

Guest appearances

References

External links

 
 Soundclound

Year of birth missing (living people)
Living people
English record producers
English soul musicians
Singers from London
English male singer-songwriters
English electronic musicians